Elvis Ali Hazarika is an Indian swimmer from Assam. 

Hazarika started swimming at the age of one and a half and swam across Dighalipukhuri in Guwahati at the age of four. He participated in the Asia Pacific Championship at the age of nine and represented India in the SAF Games.  

In June 2018, Hazarika crossed 29 km of the English Channel in an attempt to swim across it.  He is the only Assamese person to swim this distance on the channel so far.

In 2019, he announced that he was attempting to cross the Catalina Channel in the United States, connecting Santa Catalina Island and Southern California. The event was dedicated to two Assamese youths, Abhijit and Nilotpal, who were killed by miscreants in Karbi Anglong district. On 15 August of that year, he became the first person in Northeast India to swim across the channel, taking  10 hours 59 minutes along with team-mate Rimo Saha of West Bengal.

References

Living people
1981 births
Indian male swimmers
Indian male freestyle swimmers
Indian male butterfly swimmers
Indian male medley swimmers
Swimmers from Assam
South Asian Games medalists in swimming
South Asian Games silver medalists for India
South Asian Games bronze medalists for India